Frank Newman (24 October 1898 – 1977) was an English footballer who played as a winger for Port Vale, Exeter City, Halifax Town, and Yeovil & Petters United.

Career
Newman had a trial at Aston Villa before he joined joined Port Vale in December 1920. He made his Football League debut on Christmas Day, in a 2–0 defeat to Bristol City at The Old Recreation Ground. He played 19 of the remaining 23 Second Division games that season, but was released in the summer. He later played for Exeter City, making his debut against Charlton Athletic in September 1921. He remained an ever-present for the Third Division South side throughout the remainder of the 1921–22 campaign. He joined Halifax Town in summer 1923, but played just four Third Division North matches before rejoining Exeter City. He played sixteen games for the "Grecians" and then signed with Yeovil & Petters United in 1927.

Style of play

Career statistics
Source:

References

Sportspeople from Nuneaton
English footballers
Association football wingers
Port Vale F.C. players
Exeter City F.C. players
Halifax Town A.F.C. players
Yeovil Town F.C. players
English Football League players
1898 births
1977 deaths